An L-kick, also called aú batido, is a movement in breakdancing, capoeira and other martial arts and dance forms. It is executed by throwing the body into a cartwheel motion, but rather than completing the wheel, the body flexes while supported by one hand on the ground.  One leg is brought downwards and forwards in a kicking motion, while the other remains in the air (giving rise to the name).

L-kick
In breakin', The L-kick is usually considered a freeze before returning to standing. Variations include a pike freeze, in which the non-kicking leg is bent dramatically towards the body so that the legs resemble a shotgun shape, an elbow L-kick where the kick is supported by the elbow and forearm placed on the ground rather than just a hand, and a capoeira switch where L-kicks are performed with first one leg then the other, in different directions and without landing the cartwheel motion.

Aú batido

The aú batido, also called aú quebrado, aú malandro, beija flor or aú Amazonas, is an acrobatic kick in capoeira where one arm is used to support the body high in the air while one of the legs performs a high kick directed at the opponent's head or torso. This movement can be used as both offensively and defensively, the latter being usually when attempting to perform a cartwheel and the opponent attacks.

The aú batido was introduced successfully in mixed martial arts by Anthony Pettis, who has a capoeira background and showed the move against Shane Roller in WEC 50.

References

Capoeira
Breakdance moves
Kicks
Martial art techniques